Mamadou Coulibaly is a Malian judoka. He competed in the men's half-lightweight event at the 1992 Summer Olympics.

References

External links
 

Year of birth missing (living people)
Living people
Malian male judoka
Olympic judoka of Mali
Judoka at the 1992 Summer Olympics
Place of birth missing (living people)
21st-century Malian people